The Chilgog Formation, also known as the Chilgok Formation, is an Early Cretaceous geologic formation in South Korea. Formerly dated to the Berriasian to Hauterivian, later dating has established an Albian age. Dinosaur remains, possibly of sauropods, are among the fossils that have been recovered from the formation, although none have yet been referred to a specific genus.

Description 
The formation predominantly consists of sandstone, mudstone and conglomerate, with subordinate tuff and other volcanics. It overlies the Jinju Formation and underlies the Silla Conglomerate, which underlies the Haman Formation, respectively.

See also 
 :ko:경상 분지 (Gyeongsang Basin)
 List of dinosaur-bearing rock formations
 List of stratigraphic units with indeterminate dinosaur fossils

References

Bibliography 

  
  
   
 

Geologic formations of South Korea
Lower Cretaceous Series of Asia
Cretaceous South Korea
Albian Stage
Sandstone formations
Mudstone formations
Conglomerate formations
Tuff formations
Paleontology in South Korea